Yuri Pines (Hebrew: יורי פינס; Russian: Юрий Анатольевич Пинес; born 1964) is a Ukraine-born Israeli sinologist and the Michael W. Lipson Professor of Chinese Studies at the Hebrew University in Jerusalem.

Pines was born in Kiev, Ukraine and immigrated to Israel as a child in 1979.  He studied under Lothar von Falkenhausen at UCLA and under Liu Zehua at Nankai University, in Tianjin,  earning the PhD at Hebrew University in 1998.

Pines attributes the endurance of the unified Chinese state, in both the imperial and contemporary periods, "to the fact that philosophers of the Warring States period, whatever their other differences, agreed on the principle of unification under a powerful ruler, and this principle became the basis of Chinese political thought."

Books 
 Zhou History Unearthed: The Bamboo Manuscript Xinian and Early Chinese Historiography (Columbia University Press, 2020)
 The Book of Lord Shang: Apologetics of State Power in Early China (Columbia University Press, 2017)
The Everlasting Empire: Traditional Chinese Political Culture and Its Enduring Legacy, (Princeton University Press, 2012).
Envisioning Eternal Empire: Chinese Political Thought of the Warring States Era, Honolulu: University of Hawaii Press, 2009.
Foundations of Confucian Thought: Intellectual Life in the Chunqiu Period, 722-453 B.C.E. Honolulu: University of Hawaii Press, 2002.
Mekorot Ha-Keisarut Ha-Sinit (Origins of the Chinese Empire [in Hebrew]). With Gideon Shelach. Yitzhak Shichor, ed.  Volume 1 of Kol Asher mi-takhat le-shamaim: Sin Ha-Keisarit (All under Heaven: Imperial China [in Hebrew]). Raanana: The Open University Press, 2011.

יורי פינס וגדעון שלח עם יצחק שיחור (עורך ראשי), מקורות הקיסרות הסינית) כרך א של סדרה כל אשר מתחת לשמיים: סין הקיסרית). רעננה: האוניברסיטה הפתוחה, 2011.
uri Pines and Gideon Shelach, with Yitzhak Shichor, ed., Sin ha-Keisarit ha-Mukdemet (Early Imperial China [in Hebrew]). Volume 2 of Kol Asher mi-takhat le-shamaim: Sin Ha-Keisarit (All under Heaven: Imperial China [in Hebrew]). Raanana: The Open University Press, 2013
Sin ha-Keisarit ha-Meukheret (Late Imperial China [in Hebrew]) Volume 3 of Kol Asher mi-takhat le-shamaim: Sin Ha-Keisarit (All under Heaven: Imperial China [in Hebrew]).(in progress) with Michal Biran. Yitzhak Shichor, ed.,

References

External links
Personal website

1964 births
Living people
Hebrew University of Jerusalem alumni
Academic staff of the Hebrew University of Jerusalem
Israeli Jews
Israeli sinologists
Ukrainian emigrants to Israel
Ukrainian Jews